Jeffrey Glen Hunt (born February 15, 1973) is an American television director and former steadicam and camera operator.

Career
As a steadicam and camera operator he worked on the films Casper Meets Wendy (1998), With Friends Like These... (1998) and But I’m a Cheerleader (1999). In television, he camera operated on the series The Pretender, Get Real and CSI: Crime Scene Investigation, making his television directorial debut on the latter series.

Some of his other television directing credits include: CSI: NY, Cold Case, Close to Home, Chuck, Terminator: The Sarah Connor Chronicles, Dark Blue, Burn Notice, Chase, The Forgotten, Alphas, Person of Interest, The Vampire Diaries, Hawaii 5-0, Nikita, and Fringe.

He is not to be confused with another Jeffrey Hunt, a second assistant director who worked on the series Las Vegas and Numb3rs.

References

External links

1973 births
American television directors
Living people
Artists from Tulsa, Oklahoma